Mehdi Halıcı (born 10 April 1927 in Konya, died 8 April 2008 in İzmir) was a Turkish writer of Kurdish origin who wrote several novels and books about Kurdish and Turkish culture and history. He was also widely known as Cemşid Bender, the pseudonym he used for books and articles on the Kurdish culture and history.

Personal life
Halıcı was born to Sabri Bey, a carpet salesman from Kiğı who settled in Konya. Sabri was a well-known disciple of Said Nursi. Halıcı was the brother of poet and politician Feyzi Halıcı and food writer Nevin Halıcı and an uncle to businessman and politician Emrehan Halıcı and sociologist Nilgün Çelebi.

Works
Among the books written by Halıcı are Konya sazı ve türküleri (1985) and Karides durağı: hikâyeler (1967).

References

Turkish novelists
20th-century Turkish lawyers
Turkish non-fiction writers
Turkish Kurdish people
People from Konya
1927 births
2008 deaths
20th-century novelists
20th-century non-fiction writers
People from Bingöl Province